is a passenger railway station located in the city of Hachiōji, Tokyo, Japan, operated by the private railway operator Keio Corporation.

Lines 
Naganuma Station is served by the Keio Line, and is located 34.9 kilometers from the starting point of the line at Shinjuku Station.

Station layout 
This station consists of two opposed elevated side platforms serving two tracks,  with the station building located above underneath.

Platforms

History
The station opened on March 24, 1925. It was rebuilt with elevated tracks in 1990.

Passenger statistics
In fiscal 2019, the station was used by an average of 4,034 passengers daily. 

The passenger figures (boarding passengers only) for previous years are as shown below.

Surrounding area
Naganuma Park

See also
 List of railway stations in Japan

References

External links

Keio Railway Station Information 

Keio Line
Stations of Keio Corporation
Railway stations in Tokyo
Railway stations in Japan opened in 1925
Hachiōji, Tokyo